Allah Verdi Mirza Farman Farmaian (1929 – August 28, 2016) was the son of the Qajar Persian nobleman Abdol Hossein Mirza Farmanfarma and his wife Hamdam Khanoum. He studied biology at Reed College (BA 1952), and obtained an MS (1955) and PhD (1959) in Biological Sciences at Stanford University, where his research focused on marine physiology at Hopkins Marine Station in Pacific Grove, California, as well as in a postdoctoral fellowship at University of California Berkeley. He did research work in membrane physiology, worked at the Marine Biological Laboratory (MBL) in Woods Hole, Massachusetts, and founded the department of physiology at Shiraz University (Iran, 1961–1967). A prominent academic in the United States, he was a professor and head of the biology department at Rutgers University in New Jersey, where he worked for 30 years, and visiting professor at Princeton University. 

He had two daughters: 
Shahzadi Dellara Khanum Farman Farmaian. 
Shahzadi Kimya Khanum Farman Farmaian. m. Michael Paul Harris

See also
 Persia
 History of Persia
 History of Iran
 Qajar dynasty of Iran
 Rutgers University

Sources
Daughter of Persia; Sattareh Farman Farmaian with Dona Munker; Crown Publishers, Inc., New York,1992
 Blood and Oil: Memoirs of a Persian Prince; Manucher Mirza Farman Farmaian. Random House, New York, 1997.

External links 
The Qajar (Kadjar) Pages
Qajars Dynasty Turkoman dynasty of Shahs of Iran

Qajar princes
Reed College alumni
1929 births
2016 deaths
Exiles of the Iranian Revolution in the United States
Iranian emigrants to the United States
Farmanfarmaian family